Amauris niavius, the friar, is a butterfly of the family Nymphalidae. It is found in the forests of tropical Africa.

The wingspan is 80–85 mm for males and 78–82 mm for females. Adults are on wing year-round (with peaks in late summer and autumn).

The larvae feed on Cynanchum (including C. medium, C. nigrum and C. vincetoxicum), Gymnema (including G. sylvestre), Marsdenia, Secamone, Vincetoxicum (syn. Tylophora) and Ipomoea. Larvae of subspecies dominicanus feed on Gymnema sylvestre.

Subspecies
Amauris niavius niavius (from western Kenya to Zaire, Angola, Cameroon, Sierra Leone, Guinea, Fernando Pó (Macías Nguema Island))
Amauris niavius dominicanus Trimen, 1879 (Natal, Mozambique, from Rhodesia to Malawi, eastern Tanzania and Kenya east of the Rift Valley)
Amauris niavius aethiops Rothschild & Jordan, 1903 (Ethiopia, northern Uganda, southern Sudan)

References

Seitz, A. Die Gross-Schmetterlinge der Erde 13: Die Afrikanischen Tagfalter. Plate XIII 23 c dominicanus , d (missppeling)

Amauris
Butterflies described in 1758
Taxa named by Carl Linnaeus